Osterloh is a surname.

Prominent persons with this name include:
 Gertrud Osterloh, the first woman to head the German Evangelical Church Assembly
 Ian Osterloh, a British researcher who helped with the development of Viagra
 Lerke Osterloh, a German judge, jurisprudent and tax law expert
 Lilia Osterloh, an American women's tennis player
 Margit Osterloh, a Professor of Organisation at the University of Zurich
 Sebastian Osterloh, a German professional ice hockey defenceman